The Naval Live Oaks Reservation (also known as Deer Point Live Oaks Reservation or Deer Point Plantation) is part of the Gulf Islands National Seashore, and is near Gulf Breeze, Florida. It was purchased by U.S. government in  1828 as the first federal tree farm and began operations January 18, 1829. It serves today as part of the Gulf Islands National Seashore forest community preserved by the National Park Service on January 8, 1971, and added to the U.S. National Register of Historic Places on September 28, 1998.

History
The land which comprises the present Naval Live Oaks Area was purchased with the goal of reserving the valuable live oaks resources for shipbuilders. President John Quincy Adams is credited for the authorization to establish this federal tree farm. Superintendent Henry Marie Brackenridge, who lived on the tree farm, experimented with cultivating the live oak tree. He was perhaps the United States' first federal forester.

The practice of using live oaks in shipbuilding was well established in America by 1700. Early famous live oak vessels include the USS Hancock (1776), an American revolutionary privateer, and the USS Constitution (1797) and USS Constellation (1797). The USS Constitution saw action against the British during the War of 1812, receiving the nickname "Old Ironsides" due to the strength of its live oak construction. The need for wooden ship timber diminished with the advent of iron and steel warships. However, in 1926 live oak timbers from the Pensacola area were found to be useful in the restoration of the USS Constitution, a National Monument.

U.S. Route 98 goes through the southern portion of the land. To the south of Highway 98 is a visitor's center for the Gulf Islands National Seashore and some public beach areas. On the north side there is one picnic area with a trail to a bluff overlooking Pensacola Bay. There are trails throughout the park.

References

External links

 Santa Rosa County listings at National Register of Historic Places
 Gulf Islands National Seashore - Official NPS website
 Gulf Islands Wilderness at Wildernet
 Gulf Islands NS at Hiker Central

Gallery

Archaeological sites in Florida
National Register of Historic Places in Santa Rosa County, Florida
Wilderness areas of Florida
Protected areas established in 1971
Protected areas of Santa Rosa County, Florida
Gulf Islands National Seashore
1971 establishments in Florida